Günter Hoge (7 October 1940 – 6 November 2017) was a German footballer.

Club career 
He played as a striker for ZASK Vorwärts Berlin, Motor Köpenick, Union Berlin and Motor Hennigsdorf. He scored nine goals in 75 East German top-flight matches.

International career 
Hoge won six caps East Germany national team between 1961 and 1968.

Career after pro times 
The former player coached in the lower leagues in the (East) Berlin and Brandenburg region. Hoge died in 2017.

External links

References

1940 births
2017 deaths
German footballers
East German footballers
East Germany international footballers
1. FC Frankfurt players
1. FC Union Berlin players
Association football forwards
Footballers from Berlin